Nahabed Rusinian (1819–1876) was a prominent Ottoman Armenian poet, publicist, physician, orator, writer, political activist, translator, and contributor to the Armenian National Constitution.

Life 
Nahabed Rusinian was born in the village of Efkere near Kayseri in 1819 to Armenian parents. His family moved to Constantinople in 1828. He completed his secondary education in Constantinople and in 1840, he was awarded a scholarship to continue his studies in medicine in Paris. While in Paris, Rusinian audited courses on literature and philosophy at the Sorbonne, and was influenced by the ideas of Lamartine, Jean-Jacques Rousseau, Montesquieu, Victor Hugo, and other political philosophers. It was at the Sorbonne where Rusinian was confronted, for the very first time, with the principle of popular vote and other constitutionalist ideas. Rusinian returned to Constantinople in 1851 and upon recommendation of Servitchen, he became the family physician of Fuad Pasha. He died in 1879 in Istanbul.

Political activism
His first attempts at political reform, within the Armenian millet, were concentrated on language and education. His Ուղղախօսութիւն (Orthology), with all its shortcomings, was the result of a creative mind, and possessed the value of a pioneering effort. In 1858 he was appointed by the Ottoman government an official physician for the Military Hospital of Istanbul where he served until 1860. In the millet's national assemblies, Rusinian was considered the most liberal deputy, constantly conceiving new projects for reform. After the establishment of the Armenian National Constitution and during the National Assembly sessions, Rusinian switched alternatively between speaker of the assembly and deputy.

Literary activity
Nahapet Rusinian translated numerous literary works from French authors such as Victor Hugo's Ruy Blas. His poem "Giligia", though an adaptation of Frédéric Bérat's French poem "My Normandy", contains nationalist and emotional themes. It became the lyrics of the famous song of the same name.

References

External links
"Kilikia" song with lyrics
 Jennifer Manoukian, "Nahabed Rusinian," Encyclopedia of Romantic Nationalism in Europe: https://ernie.uva.nl/viewer.p/21/56/object/131-515557 

19th-century writers from the Ottoman Empire
Armenian-language writers
Physicians from the Ottoman Empire
Politicians of the Ottoman Empire
Ethnic Armenian translators
People from Kayseri
Armenians from the Ottoman Empire
1819 births
1876 deaths
19th-century translators
19th-century male writers
19th-century poets from the Ottoman Empire